Joji "George" Kawaguchi (川口譲二) (June 15, 1927, Fukakusa, Kyoto - November 1, 2003, Tokyo) was a Japanese jazz drummer and bandleader.

Kawaguchi was raised in Dairen, Manchukuo, at that time a Japanese-occupied territory. He played in his father's ensemble as a teenager, and after World War II moved back to Japan, where he embarked on a career in jazz. He played first with an ensemble called the Azumanians, then joined the Big Four with Hidehiko Matsumoto, Hachidai Nakamura, and Mitsuru Ono; this ensemble played intermittently into the 1980s. He played extensively with Art Blakey on tour in the 1980s. He recorded extensively as a leader; his sidemen included Isao Suzuki, Motohiko Hino, Takeshi Inomata, Donald Harrison, Terence Blanchard, Norio Maeda, Tatsuya Takahashi, and Nobuo Hara.

On July 22, 1966, he played with the John Coltrane quintet in Tokyo while the group was touring Japan.

References

"George Kawaguchi". The New Grove Dictionary of Jazz. 2nd edition, ed. Barry Kernfeld.

1927 births
2003 deaths
Japanese jazz bandleaders
Japanese jazz drummers
People of Manchukuo
Musicians from Kyoto Prefecture